The lesser elaenia (Elaenia chiriquensis) is a species of bird in the family Tyrannidae, the tyrant flycatchers.

It is found in Argentina, Aruba, Bolivia, Brazil, Colombia, Costa Rica, Ecuador, French Guiana, Guyana, Netherlands Antilles, Panama, Paraguay, Peru, Suriname, Trinidad and Tobago, and Venezuela. Its natural habitats are dry savanna, subtropical or tropical dry shrubland, subtropical or tropical seasonally wet or flooded lowland grassland, and heavily degraded former forest.

Subspecies
Two subspecies are recognized:
 E. c. chiriquensis – Lawrence, 1865: found in Costa Rica and Panama
 E. c. albivertex – Pelzeln, 1868: found in Colombia to the Guianas, Brazil and northern Argentina

References

Further reading

External links

lesser elaenia
Birds of Panama
Birds of Colombia
Birds of Venezuela
Birds of Peru
Birds of Bolivia
Birds of Brazil
Birds of the Cerrado
Birds of Trinidad and Tobago
Birds of the Guianas
lesser elaenia
Birds of the Amazon Basin
Taxonomy articles created by Polbot